Aldehuela de Yeltes is a village and municipality in the province of Salamanca,  western Spain, part of the autonomous community of Castile and León. The municipality has an area of 

References

Municipalities in the Province of Salamanca